Kim Min-seok (Korean: 김민석, born February 19, 1993) is a South Korean former figure skater. He is the 2012 Asian Trophy silver medalist, and a two-time (2009, 2010) South Korean national champion. He is the first Korean skater to land a triple Axel in ISU competition.

Programs

Competitive highlights

References

External links 

 

South Korean male single skaters
Living people
1993 births
Figure skaters at the 2011 Asian Winter Games
Competitors at the 2013 Winter Universiade
Sportspeople from Daejeon